The C Scow is an American sailing dinghy that was designed by John O. Johnson as a one-design racer and first built as early as 1905. Sources disagree as to the first-built date, with claims of 1905, 1906 and 1923.

Production
The design was in initially built by Johnson Boat Works of White Bear Lake, Minnesota, United States and, starting in 1945 by Melges Performance Sailboats of Zenda, Wisconsin. It remains in  production, with 2,000 boats reported as completed by 1994.

Design
The C Scow is a recreational sailboat, with the early examples built predominantly of wood and later ones from fiberglass. It has a catboat rig with wooden or aluminum spars. The hull has a scow hull with a plumb transom, a transom-hung rudder controlled by a tiller, twin retractable centerboards and polystyrene foam flotation for safety. It displaces .

For sailing the design is equipped with running backstays, a raked mast and a boom that is very low to the deck, necessitating a recessed radial track for the boom vang. The boat's forestays can be adjusted while sailing, controlled by a lever mounted aft of the boom vang's recessed radial track. There are quick-releases for the backstays and turnbuckle adjustments for the shrouds. Class rules prohibit pulling the mast to the windward side, however. The design has a ballbearing-equipped mainsheet traveler. The boat has a double-ended outhaul with a 6:1 mechanical advantage, plus a Cunningham, to control mainsail shape.

Operational history
The design is regulated and racing organized by a class club, the National C Scow Sailing Association.

In a 1994 review Richard Sherwood wrote, "As may be seen from the rating, this cat-rigged scow is fast. Scows were developed in the Midwest, but the C-Scow can also be found in Texas and California. There is extensive control ... These boats are one-design, with strict control of hull shape."

See also
List of sailing boat types

References

External links

Dinghies
1900s sailboat type designs
1920s sailboat type designs
Two-person sailboats
Scows
Sailboat type designs by John O. Johnson
Sailboat type designs by Johnson Boat Works
Sailboat types built by Melges Performance Sailboats